Béarn is a municipality in northwestern Quebec, Canada in the Témiscamingue Regional County Municipality.

History
The place was first incorporated as the Parish Municipality of Saint-Placide in 1913, taking its name from the parish that was founded two years earlier. Because it was known as Béarn in common use, the name was changed in 1936 to Saint-Placide-de-Béarn, and in 1983, it changed status to municipality and the name was shortened to the current name.

Demographics
Population trend:
 Population in 2016: 690 (2006 to 2011 population change: -11.9%)
 Population in 2011: 775 (2006 to 2011 population change: -12.2%)
 Population in 2006: 883
 Population in 2001: 942
 Population in 1996: 973
 Population in 1991: 1014

Private dwellings occupied by usual residents: 327 (total dwellings: 386)

Mother tongue:
 English as first language: 0.7%
 French as first language: 98.6%
 English and French as first language: 0.7%
 Other as first language: 0%

See also
 List of municipalities in Quebec

References

Municipalities in Quebec
Incorporated places in Abitibi-Témiscamingue
Témiscamingue Regional County Municipality